Vidhya Vinu Mohan is an Indian actress in Malayalam and Tamil film and television industry.

Filmography

TV serials

References

External links
 
 

Actresses from Kerala
Actresses in Malayalam television
Indian television actresses
Actresses in Malayalam cinema
People from Kottayam district
21st-century Indian actresses
Actresses in Tamil cinema
Actresses in Kannada cinema
Indian film actresses
Living people
Year of birth missing (living people)
Actresses in Tamil television